Dr. Drew On Call, previously titled Dr. Drew, was an American current affairs program hosted by Dr. Drew Pinsky that aired Monday through Thursday nights on HLN. The program premiered on Monday, April 4, 2011, and aired Monday through Thursday nights. HLN ended the series on September 22, 2016.

CNN Philippines formerly aired Dr. Drew seven days a week at 11 PM local time.

See also
 Jane Velez-Mitchell
 Nancy Grace

References

External links
Official Program Website
Official Personal Website

CNN Headline News original programming
2011 American television series debuts
2010s American television news shows